Mr. Vocalist Best is a compilation album by American singer-songwriter Eric Martin. Released on April 6, 2011 exclusively in Japan by Sony Music Japan, the album compiles songs from Martin's four Mr. Vocalist albums from 2008 to 2010. Also included is the song "Inori", which was written and originally recorded by Yūji Sasaki for his aunt Sadako Sasaki, who was exposed to the atomic bombing of Hiroshima at the age of two and died of the effects ten years later in 1955. Two versions of the album were released: a single CD edition and a limited edition two-CD set with DVD.

The album peaked at No. 220 on Oricon's albums chart.

Track listing

Charts

References

External links
 
 

Mr. Vocalist Best
Eric Martin (musician) albums
Sony Music Entertainment Japan compilation albums
Covers albums